Barry Levinson is a director, writer, and producer known for his work in film and television

Films

Executive producer only
 Kafka (1991)
 Wilder Napalm (1993)
 A Little Princess (1995)
 Donnie Brasco (1997)
 The Perfect Storm (2000)
 Analyze That (2002)
 Deliver Us from Eva (2003)

Acting roles

Television

TV series

Producer

Executive producer only

TV movies

Executive producer only
 The Second Civil War (1997)
 Homicide: The Movie (2000)
 Shot in the Heart (2001)
 Strip Search (2004)
 Phil Spector (2013)

Acting roles

Other works

References 

Levinson, Barry